José Rodríguez Granada was a Mexican art director who worked on more than two hundred films during his career.

Selected filmography
 Judas (1936)
 The Escape (1944)
 Adventure in the Night (1948)
 Midnight (1949)
 My General's Women (1951)

References

Bibliography
 Emilio García Riera. Historia documental del cine mexicano: 1929-1937. Universidad de Guadalajara, 1992.

External links

Year of birth unknown
Year of death unknown
Mexican art directors